725 W. Randolph Street is  proposed skyscraper in Chicago designed by architectural firm Roger Ferris + Partners with architect of record Perkins Eastman. As proposed, the building will contain residences and an Equinox-brand hotel. It is one of two buildings under development in the West Loop by Related Midwest that has faced opposition from local residents.  The Chicago Plan Commission approved the building in 2018, and Related plans to break ground in 2019.

See also
List of tallest buildings in Chicago

References

Buildings and structures in Chicago
Buildings developed by the Related Companies